Waveskis, previously known as "Paddle Ski,” is a surfboard where the rider 'sits' on top of the surfboard. Waveski surfing is a dynamic sport combining paddle power with the manoeuvrability and performance of a surfboard. A Waveski resembles a larger volume surfboard, with the addition of a hollowed out seat,fins,foot straps and seat belt enabling the rider to remain attached to the board for maneuvers and to 'eskimo roll' if overturned.  The waveski rider or waveski surfer uses a double-ended paddle for paddling motion while seated in the waveski. To turn the rider uses his weight to lean on the side rails and paddle to pivot or propel the board up the wave.

History
Danny Broadhurst, a Long Island, New York, surfer created some early waveskis in the 1970s, although these were heavy, bulky and not particularly maneuverable. The sport experienced its major growth in the 1980s with manufacturers like Macski & Kolaski being a dominant force in the market exporting worldwide to countries such as Australia, the US as well as Europe. Original boards had wooden frames covered in glass fibre then molded 'Pop=Out' molded hollow boards which evolved to foam injected and followed by custom hand made boards were being shaped and glassed out of polystyrene foam and epoxy resins. Contemporary boards are shaped in precision CNC machines and weigh around  when completed.

Description
Many of the manoeuvres waveskiers have been performing since the 1980s are only now becoming mainstream moves in surfing, where they were mocked in days gone by surfers, maneuvers such as aerials, flip aerials and various other radical moves one can do on a wave. The sport is experiencing a resurgence in countries such as Brazil and France tying in with the river and sea kayak sports and holding joint competitions as they share a common functionality. Competitions are similar to stand up surfing ones and are judged on the performance of the rider on the waves within a 20-minute heat.

Equipment

High performance skis weigh  and are custom made using epoxy resin and EPS foam, which makes the waveski light and strong. Waveskis are designed for surfing ocean waves, while surf ski are designed for racing in open water.

Waveskis designs include:
Shorter and "fatter" Australian style skis, used for high performance "slash and burn" surfing.
American style waveskis.
"Skegles" skis for performing tricks.
Tandem skis.
The "Jbay" wave-shape ski, which enables riders to position further back on the ski for better maneuverability.

See also 
 Kayak
 Surf Kayaking
 Surf

Human-powered vehicles
Kayaks